Liu Lin (born 1964) is a lieutenant general (zhongjiang) of the People's Liberation Army (PLA) who served as commander of the Xinjiang Military District in 2021.

Biography
Liu was born in 1964. In July 2015, he became deputy commander of Nanjiang Military District, rising to commander in March 2019. In 2020, he led the delegations participated in the India-China Commander Level Talks. In March 2021, he was commissioned as commander of the Xinjiang Military District, replacing Wang Haijiang. In September 2021, he was admitted to member of the standing committee of the Chinese Communist Party's Xinjiang Regional Committee, the region's top authority. 

He was promoted to the rank of major general (Shaojiang) in January 2015 and lieutenant general (zhongjiang) in 2021.

References

1964 births
Living people
People's Liberation Army generals
Chinese Communist Party politicians